Hapoel Ironi Or Akiva is an Israeli football club based in Or Akiva. The club currently plays in Liga Gimel Samaria division.

History
A club called Hapoel Or Akiva existed as early as 1956, and played in Liga Gimel during the 1960s.

The current club was founded in 2013, as a successor to Maccabi Or Akiva, which was founded in 1966 and played in its prime in Liga Alef, the third tier of Israeli football, for the last time, in the 1995–96 season.

After the 2012–13 season, in which Maccabi Or Akiva finished at the bottom of Liga Gimel Samaria division, the Municipality of Or Akiva have decided to establish a new club instead, and appointed an association, in order to manage football in the city.

Hapoel Ironi Or Akiva finished their debut season in the 14th and second bottom place of Liga Gimel Samaria division.

In the 2015–16 season, the club have won the Israel State Cup for Liga Gimel Samaria division, following a victory of 4–3 after extra time, against Hapoel Tirat HaCarmel.

Honours

Cups

External links
Official website 
Hapoel Ironi Or Akiva  Israel Football Association

References

Football clubs in Israel
Hapoel football clubs
1956 establishments in Israel
2013 establishments in Israel
2020 disestablishments in Israel
Association football clubs established in 2013
Association football clubs established in 1956
Association football clubs disestablished in 2020